Benjamin A. Elman (born 1946) is Gordon Wu '58 Professor of Chinese Studies, Princeton University. His teaching and research fields include Chinese intellectual and cultural history, history of science and history of education in late imperial China.

Academic career
Elman earned his B.A. from Hamilton College in 1968. He was in the Peace Corps in Thailand, 1968 - 71 serving as provincial zone office and field supervisor for the Thailand National Malaria Eradication Project in Nakhon Sawan, Uthaitani, Chainat, Kamphaengphet, and Tak provinces along Burmese border. The Peace Corps provided instruction in Thai language and in epidemiological procedures. Upon leaving the Peace Corps, he was with the New York State Department of Public Health, 1972.

Elman earned a Master's Degree from American University, Washington in 1972 - 73. Enrolled in M.A. Program in Area Studies: Modern China. He studied in Taipei, Taiwan through the Inter— University Center for Chinese, in the academic year 1973–74, then the Inter–University Center for Japanese, Tokyo, Japan 1977–78. He received his Ph.D. in Oriental Studies from the University of Pennsylvania (1980), studying with Nathan Sivin and Susan Naquin.

He was Ziskind Lecturer, a short term position, in East Asia Studies at Colby College, Waterville, Maine, 1980–82; University of Michigan, Center for Chinese Studies, 1984– 85; Postdoctoral Research Fellow, Rice University, Houston, Texas, 1985–86. From 1986-2002 he was Associate Professor and full Professor, University of California, Los Angeles. From 1999 to 2001 he was the Mellon Visiting Professor in Traditional Chinese Civilization at the Institute for Advanced Study. He joined the Princeton faculty in 2002. In 2011 he delivered the Edwin O. Reischauer Lectures at Harvard.

Major publications and research interests

 
  
 with Alexander Woodside, ed.,

Reference and further reading
  
 Peter Perdue, (review) A Cultural History of Modern Science in Late Imperial China (2006). 
 Interview Princeton University, Department of History.

Notes

External links
 Princeton Department of History 
 Curriculum Vitae

1946 births
Living people
21st-century American historians
American male non-fiction writers
American sinologists
Princeton University faculty
Hamilton College (New York) alumni
American University alumni
University of Pennsylvania alumni
Peace Corps volunteers
American expatriates in Thailand
American expatriates in Taiwan
American expatriates in Japan
21st-century American male writers